En svensk tiger was a slogan and an image that became part of a propaganda campaign in Sweden during World War II. Its goal was to prevent espionage by encouraging secrecy.

Explanation
In Swedish, the word svensk can mean both the adjective "Swedish" and the noun "Swede" while tiger can mean either the noun for a tiger (the animal) or the present tense of the verb tiga ("to keep silent", or more colloquially to "keep one's mouth shut"), giving the poster the double meaning "a Swedish tiger" or "a Swede keeps silent". The phrase is comparable in use to "loose lips sink ships" in the United States and with "careless talk costs lives" and other similar wartime slogans in the United Kingdom.

Commission and use
The famous poster for the propaganda campaign was created by Bertil Almqvist in 1941, commissioned by the Swedish National Board of Information (SIS).

Legal battle
After eleven years of legal battle, the Swedish Armed Forces, who had been using the image without permission, paid 700 000 SEK in damages to the copyright owners in 2008.

In 2020, the Swedish satirist Aron Flam was prosecuted for copyright infringement after using a variant of the image in his book Det här är en svensk tiger (English: "This is a Swedish tiger").

See also
 MUST (Militära underrättelse- och säkerhetstjänsten)

References

Sweden in World War II
Fictional tigers
Propaganda posters
Sayings